Charles Cruchon was a French cyclist of the early 1900s and 1910s. He was born in Paris in 1883.

He took part in the Tour of Belgium in 1907, as well as finishing in the top ten in two Tours de France in 1910 and 1911.

He died in 1956 in Paris.

Major competitions
 1907 Tour of Belgium - 1st place
 1908 Tour de France - did not finish
 1909 Tour de France - did not finish
 1910 Tour de France - 5th place
 1911 Tour de France - 7th place
 1912 Tour de France - did not finish
 1913 Tour de France - did not finish
 1914 Tour de France - 35th place

External links
 
 

French male cyclists
1883 births
1956 deaths
Cyclists from Paris